Lena Litvak and Carol Zhao are the defending champions, having won the event in 2013, but decided not to play together. Litvak played with Marcela Zacarías and lost in the first round to Miharu Imanishi and Miyabi Inoue, while Zhao played with Erin Routliffe.

Hiroko Kuwata and Riko Sawayanagi won the title after Erin Routliffe and Carol Zhao gave them a walkover in the final because of an injury.

Seeds

Draw

Draw

References
 Main Draw

Challenger Banque Nationale de Granby
Challenger de Granby